The African Geographical Review is a biannual peer-reviewed academic journal published by Taylor & Francis on behalf of the American Association of Geographers' Africa Specialty Group.

The journal was originally established in 1963 at Makerere University (Uganda) as the East African Geographical Review. Due to political turmoil in Uganda, the journal had to suspend publication for a number of years. It was renamed as the African Geographical Review in 2000. Since 2012 it is published by Taylor & Francis.

References

External links 
 

Geography journals
Taylor & Francis academic journals
English-language journals
Publications established in 1963
Biannual journals
American Association of Geographers
African studies journals
Academic journals associated with learned and professional societies of the United States